Sakawrdai is a Medium town in Aizawl District in the state of Mizoram, India. It is the Headquarter of Sinlung Hills Council. The native language of Sakawrdai is Hmar and most of the village people speak Hmar which is also considered as genealogic line of the Mizo. Sakawrdai people used Hmar and partly Duhlian language for communication.

Geography 

The latitude of Sakawrdai, Mizoram, India is 24.2268779, and the longitude is 92.9538125

References 

Aizawl
Cities and towns in Aizawl district